Nicola Ciotola (born 28 March 1984) is an Italian footballer.

Career
Ciotola began his career at local club Monteruscello. In 2003, he joined Napoli, but was immediately sold to Sassari Torres in a co-ownership deal. In June, Sassari Torres acquired him outright. He then left for Giugliano and then Pisa. He followed the team through promotion to Serie B as 2006–07 Serie C1 playoffs winners.

After Pisa's relegation at the end of season, Ciotola joined newly promoted Serie B team Avellino in another co-ownership deal. Despite the team's relegation, Avellino purchased the remaining half of his rights. However, the team soon fell to bankruptcy.

In July 2009, Ciotola joined Verona on a three-year contract. He played 31 out of 34 games, but only started a handful of times. In July 2010, he left for Taranto along with teammate Julien Rantier.

On 17 January 2011, Ciotola left for Juve Stabia.  He made his debut in the 2010–11 Coppa Italia Lega Pro campaign. Juve Stabia beat Taranto in the cup earlier that season, but Ciotola did not make an appearance.

At the end of season, both Verona and Juve Stabia promoted to Serie B. Ciotola remained in the Italian third division for Como. He made his debut on 11 September.

On 31 July 2012, Ciotola joined L'Aquila on a two-year contract.

Honors
 Coppa Italia Lega Pro (1): 2011

References

External links
 Football.it profile 
 

1984 births
Living people
Sportspeople from the Province of Benevento
Italian footballers
Association football forwards
Serie B players
Serie C players
Serie D players
Pisa S.C. players
U.S. Avellino 1912 players
Hellas Verona F.C. players
Taranto F.C. 1927 players
S.S. Juve Stabia players
Como 1907 players
L'Aquila Calcio 1927 players
S.S. Ischia Isolaverde players
S.E.F. Torres 1903 players
A.S.D. Football Club Matese players
Footballers from Campania